Han Hye-rin (born November 6, 1988) is a South Korean actress. She played the leading role in the television drama My One and Only (2011).

Filmography

Film

Television series

Variety show

Awards and nominations

References

External links 

 
 Han Hye-rin at Koen Group 
 
 
 

1988 births
Living people
South Korean television actresses
South Korean film actresses
Dongduk Women's University alumni
People from Busan